A Girl Called Rosemary is a 1996 German biography film directed by Bernd Eichinger. It is a remake of the 1958 film Rosemary.

Cast

External links 

1996 television films
1996 films
German television films
Films set in the 1950s
Prostitution in television
German films based on actual events
Television remakes of films
German-language television shows
Works about prostitution in Germany
1990s German-language films
Films set in West Germany
Sat.1 original programming